Thiago dos Santos Costa (born February 28, 1983) is a Brazilian footballer who plays for São Luiz.

Club statistics

References

j-league
jsgoal
Furacao.com

1983 births
Living people
Brazilian footballers
J2 League players
Ehime FC players
Esporte Clube São Luiz players
Brazilian expatriate footballers
Expatriate footballers in Japan
Association football defenders